The Island Grove Masonic Lodge No. 125 is a historic building in Alachua County.  It was added to the National Register of Historic Places on December 7, 2010. It is located at 20114 Southeast 219 Avenue.

See also
National Register of Historic Places listings in Alachua County, Florida
National Register of Historic Places listings in Florida

References

National Register of Historic Places in Alachua County, Florida
Masonic buildings in Florida
Clubhouses on the National Register of Historic Places in Florida